Henry Joseph Goodman (March 18, 1919 – March 25, 2007) was an American football player. 

A native of Bradford, Pennsylvania, Goodman attended Bradford High School and then played college football at St. Bonaventure, George Washington, and West Virginia. 

He also played professional football in the National Football League (NFL) as a tackle for the Detroit Lions. He appeared in 11 NFL games during the 1942 season.

References

1919 births
2007 deaths
American football tackles
People from Bradford, Pennsylvania
St. Bonaventure Brown Indians football players
George Washington Colonials football players
West Virginia Mountaineers football players
Detroit Lions players
Players of American football from Pennsylvania